hap inc. is an independent Japanese video game developer best known for the Mom Hid My Game! series. The company is well-known for its "poorly" English-translated titles.

History 
hap inc. released their first game, 10 Dice, on July 3, 2012, an app where the user rolled dice. On August 8, 2016, hap inc. released Mom Hid My Game! for the iOS and Android, which would be the first installment in the series with the same name. Later on January 3, 2017, a sequel to Mom Hid My Game! was released, titled Hidden my game by mom 2, and a third installment, Hidden my game by mom 3, was later released on July 17, 2018.

Products 
 10 Dice - 2012
 Handris! - 2013
 Crazy Freekick - 2014
 Crazy Pitcher - 2014
 Toast Girl - 2014
 Crazy Horizontal bar - 2014
 Crazy Batting Center - 2015
 Vice captain - 2015
 Nyardle - 2015
 Hide & Dance! - 2016
 Mom Hid My Game! - 2016
 Hidden my game by mom 2 - 2017
 My brother ate my pudding - 2017
 Tokimeter - 2017
 Hidden my game by mom 3 - 2018
 Mr Success - 2018
 Home Runtaro - 2019
 Home Fighter - 2020

References 

Video game development companies
Video game companies of Japan
Video game companies established in 2007
Japanese companies established in 2007
Companies based in Tokyo
Indie video game developers